Senator Rector may refer to:

Chris Rector (born 1951), Maine State Senate
Henry Massey Rector (1816–1899), Arkansas State Senate